International Mobile Telecommunications-Advanced (IMT-Advanced Standard) are the requirements issued by the ITU Radiocommunication Sector (ITU-R) of the International Telecommunication Union (ITU) in 2008 for what is marketed as 4G (or in Turkey as 4.5G) mobile phone and Internet access service.

Description

An IMT-Advanced system is expected to provide a comprehensive and secure all-internet protocol based mobile broadband solution to laptop computer wireless modems, smartphones, and other mobile devices. Facilities such as ultra-broadband Internet access, voice over IP, gaming services, and streamed multimedia may be provided to users.

IMT-Advanced is intended to accommodate the quality of service (QoS) and rate requirements set by further development of existing applications like mobile broadband access, Multimedia Messaging Service (MMS), video chat, mobile TV, but also new services like high-definition television (HDTV). 4G may allow roaming with wireless local area networks, and may interact with digital video broadcasting systems. It was meant to go beyond the International Mobile Telecommunications-2000 requirements, which specify mobile phones systems marketed as 3G.

Requirements
Specific requirements of the IMT-Advanced report included:

 Based on an all-IP packet switched network.
 Interoperability with existing wireless standards.
 A nominal data rate of 100 Mbit/s while the client physically moves at high speeds relative to the station, and 1 Gbit/s while the client and station are in relatively fixed positions.
 Dynamically share and use network resources to support more simultaneous users per cell.
 Scalable channel bandwidth 5–20 MHz, optionally up to 40 MHz
 Peak link spectral efficiency of 15 bit/s/Hz in the downlink and 6.75 bit/s/Hz in the uplink (meaning that 1 Gbit/s in the downlink should be possible over less than 67 MHz bandwidth)
 System spectral efficiency of up to 3 bit/s/Hz/cell in the downlink and 2.25 bit/s/Hz/cell for indoor usage
 Seamless connectivity and global roaming across multiple networks with smooth handovers
 Ability to offer high quality of service for multimedia support

The first set of 3GPP requirements on LTE Advanced was approved in June 2008.

A summary of the technologies that have been studied as the basis for LTE Advanced is included in a technical report.

While the ITU adopts requirements and recommendations for technologies that would be used for future communications, they do not actually perform the development work themselves, and countries do not consider them binding standards. Other trade groups and standards bodies such as the Institute of Electrical and Electronics Engineers, the WiMAX Forum, and 3GPP also have a role.

Principal technologies
Physical layer transmission techniques expected to be used include:

 MIMO: To attain ultra high  spectral efficiency by means of spatial processing including multi-antenna and multi-user MIMO
 Frequency-domain-equalization, for example "multi-carrier modulation" (OFDM) in the downlink or "single-carrier frequency-domain-equalization" (SC-FDE) in the uplink: To exploit the frequency selective channel property without complex equalization.
 Frequency-domain statistical multiplexing, for example (OFDMA) or (single-carrier FDMA) (SC-FDMA, Linearly precoded OFDMA, LP-OFDMA) in the uplink: Variable bit rate by assigning different sub-channels to different users based on the channel conditions
 Turbo principle error-correcting codes: To minimize the required signal-to-noise ratio at the reception side
 Channel-dependent scheduling: To utilize the time-varying channel.
 Link adaptation: Adaptive modulation and error-correcting codes.
 Relaying, including fixed relay networks, and the cooperative relaying concept, known as multi-mode protocol.

Predecessors

Long Term Evolution

Long Term Evolution (LTE) has a theoretical net bitrate maximum capacity of 100 Mbit/s in the downlink and 50 Mbit/s in the uplink if a 20 MHz channel is used. The capacity is more if a MIMO (multiple-input and multiple-output) antenna array is used. The physical radio interface was at an early stage named "High Speed Orthogonal Packet Access" and is now named E-UTRA.

The CDMA's spread spectrum radio technology that was used in 3G systems and cdmaOne has been abandoned. It was replaced by orthogonal frequency-division multiple access and other frequency-division multiple access schemes. This is combined with MIMO antenna arrays, dynamic channel allocation, and channel-dependent scheduling.

The first publicly available LTE services were branded "4G" and opened in Sweden's capital city Stockholm (Ericsson system) and Norway's capital city Oslo (a Huawei system) on 14 December 2009. The user terminals were manufactured by Samsung. All three major U.S. wireless carriers offer LTE services.

In South Korea, SK Telecom and LG U+ have enabled access to LTE service since July 2011 for data devices, slated to go nationwide by 2012.

Mobile WiMAX (IEEE 802.16e)

The Mobile WiMAX (IEEE 802.16e-2005) mobile wireless broadband access (MWBA) standard (marketed as WiBro in South Korea) is sometimes branded 4G, and offers peak data rates of 128 Mbit/s downlink and 56 Mbit/s uplink over 20 MHz wide channels.

The first commercial mobile WiMAX service was opened by KT in Seoul, South Korea in June 2006.

In September 2008, Sprint Nextel marketed Mobile WiMAX as a "4G" network even though it did not fulfil the IMT Advanced requirements.

In Russia, Belarus, and Nicaragua, WiMax broadband internet access is offered by the Russian company Scartel and is also branded 4G, Yota.

Ultra Mobile Broadband 

Ultra Mobile Broadband (UMB) was the brand name for a discontinued 4G project within the 3GPP2 standardization group to improve the CDMA2000 mobile phone standard for next generation applications and requirements. In November 2008, Qualcomm, UMB's lead sponsor, announced it was ending development of the technology, favouring LTE instead. The objective was to achieve data speeds over 275 Mbit/s downstream and over 75 Mbit/s upstream.

Flash-OFDM 
At an early stage the Flash-OFDM system was expected to be further developed into a 4G standard.

iBurst and MBWA 
The iBurst technology, using High Capacity Spatial Division Multiple Access (HC-SDMA), was at an early stage considered as a 4G predecessor. It was incorporated by the Mobile Broadband Wireless Access (MBWA) working group into the IEEE 802.20 standard in 2008.

Candidate systems 
In October 2010, ITU-R Working Party 5D approved two industry-developed technologies. 
On December 6, 2010, ITU noted that while current versions of LTE, WiMax and other evolved 3G technologies do not fulfill IMT-Advanced requirements for 4G, some may use the term "4G" in an "undefined" fashion to represent forerunners to IMT-Advanced that show "a substantial level of improvement in performance and capabilities with respect to the initial third generation systems now deployed."

LTE Advanced 
LTE Advanced (Long-term-evolution Advanced) was formally submitted by the 3GPP organization to ITU-T in the fall 2009, and was released in 2011. The target of 3GPP LTE Advanced was to reach and surpass the ITU requirements. LTE Advanced is an improvement on the existing LTE network. 
Release 10 of LTE is expected to achieve the LTE Advanced speeds.  Release 8 in 2009 supported up to 300 Mbit/s download speeds which was still short of the IMT-Advanced standards.

WiMAX Release 2 (IEEE 802.16m) 
The WirelessMAN-Advanced evolution of IEEE 802.16e was published in May 2011 as standard IEEE 802.16m-2011.  The relevant industry promoting the technology gave it the marketing name of WiMAX Release 2.  It had an objective to fulfill the IMT-Advanced criteria.  The IMT-Advanced group formally approved this technology as meeting its criteria in October 2010. In the second half of 2012, the 802.16m-2011 standard was rolled up into the 802.16-2012 standard, excluding the WirelessMAN-Advanced radio interface part of the 802.16m-2011 standard, which got moved to IEEE Std 802.16.1-2012.

Comparison 
The following table shows a comparison of IMT-Advanced candidate systems as well as other competing technologies.

References 

Mobile telecommunications standards